Major General Eli Alva Helmick (September 23, 1863 – January 13, 1945) was a United States Army officer in the late 19th and early 20th centuries. He served in World War I, among other conflicts, and received the Distinguished Service Medal.

Military career
Helmick was born in Quaker, Indiana on September 23, 1863. He graduated from the United States Military Academy (USMA) at West Point, New York, in June 1888. Among his classmates there were several men who would, like Helmick himself, eventually attain the rank of general officer, such as James W. McAndrew, William M. Morrow, William Robert Dashiell, Robert Lee Howze, Peter Charles Harris, Peyton C. March, Henry Jervey Jr., William Voorhees Judson, John Louis Hayden, Edward Anderson, William H. Hart, Charles Aloysius Hedekin and William S. Peirce.

Helmick was commissioned into the 11th Infantry Regiment on June 11, 1888, and he did frontier duty from 1888 to 1892. He was serving in Idaho when the labor union riots in Coeur d'Alene, Idaho, occurred from September to November 1892. He served on duty at the World's Columbian Exposition in Chicago, and he then worked as a Professor of Military Science and Tactics at Hillsdale College from 1894 through 1896. Helmick commanded Fort Reno from 1898 to 1899.

Helmick participated in the Spanish–American War, serving from 1899 to 1901 as a provost marshal and inspector of the Rural Guard of Cuba, and receiving a Silver Star for his efforts. He then went to the Philippines, commanding a battalion on Mindanao in 1902 against the Moros during the Moro Rebellion. After returning to the U.S., Helmick did recruiting duty in Springfield, Massachusetts from 1903 to 1906, and he commanded Fort Liscum from 1906 to 1907. He graduated from the School of the Line in 1909, from the United States Army War College in 1910, and later from Kansas State Agricultural College with an LL.D. Helmick then served along the border with Mexico from 1915 to 1916.

On August 8, 1918, during World War I, Helmick was promoted to the rank of major general. He commanded the 8th Division from September to November 1918 and afterward commanded Base Section Number Five Service of Supply in Brest, France, receiving the Army Distinguished Service Medal for his service in the latter position. The citation for the medal reads:

Helmick joined the General Staff on August 24, 1919, and he served as the Chief of Staff of the Central Department from August 23, 1919 to May 10, 1921. He subsequently became inspector general and was reappointed to the position on November 7, 1925. Helmick retired on September 27, 1927.

Helmick lived in Honolulu in retirement. He died on January 13, 1945, and was buried at Arlington National Cemetery.

Personal life
Helmick married Elizabeth Allen Clarke on November 20, 1889, and they had three children together.

References

Bibliography

External links

1863 births
1945 deaths
Military personnel from Indiana
People from Vermillion County, Indiana
People from Honolulu
Recipients of the Silver Star
Recipients of the Distinguished Service Medal (US Army)
United States Army generals of World War I
United States Military Academy alumni
United States Army War College alumni
Kansas State University alumni
Hillsdale College faculty
Burials at Arlington National Cemetery
United States Army generals
United States Army Command and General Staff College alumni
American military personnel of the Spanish–American War